Santiago Plaza (born 23 April 1938) is a Mexican sprinter. He competed in the men's 100 metres at the 1960 Summer Olympics.

References

1938 births
Living people
Athletes (track and field) at the 1960 Summer Olympics
Mexican male sprinters
Olympic athletes of Mexico
Athletes (track and field) at the 1959 Pan American Games
Pan American Games competitors for Mexico
Spanish emigrants to Mexico
Place of birth missing (living people)
20th-century Mexican people